Lake Pierce is a lake in Polk County, Florida, in the United States. Lake Pierce was named after Franklin Pierce, 14th President of the United States.

References

Pierce
Pierce